Charles Arthur Space (October 12, 1908 – January 13, 1983) was an American film, television and stage actor. He was best known as Doc Weaver, the veterinarian, in thirty-nine episodes of the CBS television series Lassie.

Early years
Born in New Brunswick, New Jersey, Space first delved into acting at Douglass College.

Career
Space began his career in summer stock theater and eventually began appearing on Broadway. His Broadway credits include Three Men on a Horse and Awake and Sing.

He made his film debut in the 1941 crime drama Riot Squad opposite Richard Cromwell. The following year, Space appeared alongside Abbott and Costello in Rio Rita. He also had roles in Tortilla Flat (1942), Our Vines Have Tender Grapes (1945), The Fuller Brush Man (1948), and The Fuller Brush Girl (1950). In the early 1950s, Space appeared in various film serials including Government Agents vs. Phantom Legion, Canadian Mounties vs. Atomic Invaders, and Panther Girl of the Kongo.

In 1953, Space played Lt. Col. William Barrett Travis, the commander during the siege at the Alamo, in The Man from the Alamo (1953). Space was unbilled, despite having more lines of dialogue than almost any other actor during the first 10 minutes of the film.

In 1954, Space played the bandit Black Bart, or Charles Bolles, in an episode of the syndicated western television series Stories of the Century.

Throughout the mid-1950s, Space continued appearing in films such as The Spirit of St. Louis with James Stewart while guest starring on various television series. He appeared four times as Col. Tomkin in the ABC western series, Colt .45, starring Wayde Preston. During this time, Space had a recurring role on Lassie.

Space was cast as Ben Hudson in the 1959 episode "Hang 'Em High", on the syndicated anthology series, Death Valley Days,  hosted by Stanley Andrews. The dramatization focuses on the completion in 1861 of the first transcontinental telegraph line. Hudson determines that Confederates have attempted to sabotage construction because the telegraph would most benefit the Union government. Paul Birch and William Schallert were cast in the episode as Mike Walsh and Ellis Higby, respectively.

In 1960, Space landed the role of the practical farmer Herbert Brown in the 58-episode NBC television series National Velvet, with Lori Martin as his equestrian daughter, Velvet Brown, and Ann Doran as his wife, Martha. After the series ended in 1962, Space continued acting in both television and films. Among his roles were four Perry Mason appearances between 1958 and 1964. In his first appearance he played murderer Willard Scott in "The Case of the Rolling Bones," and his final role was as murderer Edgarton Cartwell in "The Case of the Paper Bullets." In 1969 Space appeared as Sam Foster on the TV series The Virginian in the episode titled "A Woman of Stone."

In 1978, he appeared in an episode of The Waltons titled "The Beau", playing Grandma Walton's former boyfriend Marcus Dane. His last role was in a 1981 episode of the television series, Walking Tall.

Death 
Space died of cancer at his home in Hollywood on January 13, 1983, at the age of 74.

Filmography

References

External links
 

1908 births
1983 deaths
20th-century American male actors
American male film actors
American male stage actors
American male television actors
Deaths from cancer in California
Male actors from New Jersey
People from New Brunswick, New Jersey